Russian Embassy School in Tokyo is a Russian overseas school in Azabudai, Minato, Tokyo. It is operated by the Russian Ministry of Foreign Affairs.

See also

 Russians in Japan
 Japanese School in Moscow
 Japan–Russia relations
 List of Ministry of Foreign Affairs of Russia overseas schools

References

External links
  Russian Embassy School in Tokyo
 
 's channel on YouTube

Tokyo
International schools in Tokyo
Japan–Russia relations
Minato, Tokyo